ŽFK Breznica is a women's football club from Pljevlja, Montenegro, founded at 2013. It plays in the Montenegrin Women's League. On season 2015–16 the team won first champion title in club's history.

The club is from the same town as one of the most successful Montenegrin clubs in men's football - FK Rudar.

History
Named after Breznica river, club is founded at 2013. ŽRK Breznica played its first season in Montenegrin Women's League at 2013–14, with final placement at second place. Same result was gained on the season 2014–15. At season 2015–16, ŽFK Breznica made huge success, surprisingly winning the champion title, after the long struggle with ŽFK Ekonomist. Two teams had same score, but ŽFK Breznica was better in direct matches. With their first title, ŽRK Breznica gained participation in 2016–17 UEFA Women's Champions League.

In all selections of ŽFK Breznica are playing more than 100 players.

Current squad
Roster at the 2019–20 UEFA Women's Champions League.

Honours and achievements
National Championship:
winners (7): 2015–16, 2016–17, 2017-18, 2018-19, 2019-20, 2020–21, 2021–22
runners-up (2): 2013–14, 2014–15

See also
Montenegrin Women's League
Football in Montenegro

References

External links
Official site

Women's football clubs in Montenegro
Association football clubs established in 2013
2013 establishments in Montenegro